Austrolentinus is a fungal genus in the family Polyporaceae. Segregated from the genus Lentinus, it is monotypic, containing the single species Austrolentinus tenebrosus, which was first described by E.J.H. Corner in 1981 as Panus tenebrosus. Austrolentinus was circumscribed by Norwegian mycologist Leif Ryvarden in 1991. The fungus occurs in Queensland, Solomon Islands and Papua New Guinea, and the Malay Peninsula.

References

Fungi of Asia
Fungi of Australia
Fungi of New Guinea
Fungi of Oceania
Polyporaceae
Monotypic Polyporales genera
Taxa named by Leif Ryvarden
Taxa described in 1991